Season 2. Hideout: The New Day We Step Into is the second extended play by South Korean boy group Cravity. It was released on August 24, 2020, by Starship Entertainment and distributed by kakao M.

The EP was a commercial success, debuting and peaking at number one on the South Korean Gaon Album Chart and at number 15 on the Oricon Albums Chart. This is their second album to top the former chart, while the album is also their lowest charting album on the latter. It has also charted at number 41 on the Billboard Japan Download Albums chart.

Singles
"Flame" is the title track of the album. The song entered at number 81 on the Gaon Download Chart on the chart issue dated August 23–29, 2020.  The song won them their first-ever music show award on SBS MTV's The Show on September 1, 2020.

Promotion
The group's promotions for the song "Flame" began on August 28, 2020, on KBS's Music Bank. Follow-up promotions for their B-side track "Ohh Ahh" began on October 22, 2020 on Mnet's M Countdown.

Commercial performance
Season 2. Hideout: The New Day We Step Into entered and peaked at number 1 on the Gaon Album Chart on the chart issue dated August 23–29, 2020. In its second week, the EP fell to number 10 and rose to number 9 on its third week.

The EP shipped 131,507 copies on the month of August, charting at number 5 on the monthly Gaon Album Chart.

The album has topped the Japanese Tower Records' album chart on the chart issue dated August 24–30, 2020 and also ranked first on 7 regions on iTunes album chart, top 3 in 12 regions and fourth over-all on the iTunes album chart.

Track listing
Credits adapted from Naver.

Charts

Accolades

Release history

See also
 List of Gaon Album Chart number ones of 2020

References

2020 EPs
Cravity EPs
Starship Entertainment EPs